La Mesa may refer to:

Mexico
 La Mesa (Tijuana)
 La Mesa Prison, a prison in the borough of La Mesa

Philippines
 La Mesa Dam and Reservoir, Quezon City
 La Mesa Watershed Reservation, an area surrounding the dam and reservoir

Panama
 La Mesa, Los Santos
 La Mesa District, Veraguas Province
 La Mesa, Veraguas, a corregimiento in the district

United States
 La Mesa, California
 La Mesa Reservoir (California), now Lake Murray, in San Diego
 La Mesa, New Mexico
 La Mesa Motel, a demolished historic motel in Albuquerque, New Mexico
 La Mesa Park, a defunct horse racing track in Raton, New Mexico

Other countries
 La Mesa (mountain), Argentina
 La Mesa, Cundinamarca, Colombia

See also
 La Mesada (disambiguation)
 Lamesa, Texas, US
 Las Mesas, a municipality in Cuenca, Castile-La Mancha, Spain